George Edwin Gard (January 16, 1843 – March 10, 1904) is one of only two men to have served as both police chief in Los Angeles, California, and sheriff of Los Angeles County, the other being William A. Hammel.  He was the city's fourth chief (December 12, 1880 – December 10, 1881), succeeding Henry King, and the county's 16th sheriff (1884–1886), succeeding Alvan T. Currier.

Sources
Except where otherwise noted, the following information comes from An Illustrated History of Los Angeles County, California, Chicago, the Lewis Publishing Company, 1889, p. 487, quoted at Los Angeles County Biographies.

Through the Civil War
Gard, the son of Dr. William V. H. Gard and Lucretia Williamson, was born in Warren County, Ohio, in 1843. His mother died when he was 3 years old and his father when George was 6, after which he was cared for by his grandfather, Garret Williamson, in Hamilton, Butler County, Ohio.

At the age of 16, the Lewis book states, "he came overland to California, accompanying his uncle, Henry Williamson, who brought with him a band of thoroughbred horses and cattle." The biography continues:

 He remained with his uncle until the next year; resided in San Jose two years and then located in Mariposa County; there engaged in mining, and was soon afterward the superintendent of Lovejoy & Gard's saw-mills, and later assistant superintendent of the Mariposa Mining Company's Mills. In 1864 Mr. Gard entered the United States military service as First Sergeant of Company H, Seventh California Volunteer Infantry, and was with that command in Arizona and New Mexico until March, 1866, at which time his company was mustered out of service.

After the Civil War
After leaving the service, Gard settled in Wilmington for two years, then moved to Los Angeles, where he established the Los Angeles Ice Company, "the first to enter into that business in Southern California." In 1869 he married Kate A. Hammel. Of their children, two were surviving in 1889 —  William Brant and Georgetta Miles. In 1871 Gard was appointed deputy county clerk for one year, then joined the Los Angeles Police Department as a detective for three years. In 1874 he became deputy county recorder and from 1875 to 1879 was chief recorder of the county. His daughter Georgetta was the mother of songwriter Buddy DeSylva.

In 1880 he was appointed chief of police of the city by the City Council. It was Gard who "fielded the first traffic squad in 1881, composed of an unknown number of officers, to 'horse, wagon and carriage' control to ensure pedestrian safety." 

Gard became a deputy sheriff, and in 1884 he was elected on the Republican ticket as the sheriff of the county. His term ended in 1886.

 In 1886 Mr. Gard purchased forty acres of land at Gladstone and the next year a tract of land at Alosta [both in the San Gabriel Valley]. Soon after his purchase he commenced active operations in subdividing his lands and inviting the settlement of that section. Early in 1887, in connection with F. M. Underwood and S. Washburne, he incorporated the Alosta Land and Water Company. Mr. Gard was the president and general manager of the company, and he developed water in the Little Dalton Cañon and piped the same to that tract at an expense of about $25,000. The lands of the company found ready sale. He also sold a portion of his property at Gladstone, and was one of the prominent leaders in opening up the section in which he resided. In addition to his real-estate operations he devoted himself to horticultural pursuits. His present home is located about one-half mile east of Gladstone, where he is establishing one of the representative fruit industries of his section, having now (1889) fifteen acres of Washington Navel oranges and a large variety of deciduous fruits on his eighty-acre tract at that point. He also has lands on Citrus and Broadway avenues in the Gladstone tract, which is well improved and producing deciduous and citrus fruits, besides business and residence property in Alosta, including wood and coal yard, cottages, etc.
 
He was active in Republican politics in the Grand Army of the Republic organization, being elected in 1888 to the GAR's national council and being named commander of the Department of California in 1889. He was a member of Olive Lodge No. 26, Knights of Pythias, of Los Angeles Lodge No. 55, Ancient Order of United Workmen.

References

See also
List of Los Angeles Police Department Chiefs of Police

1843 births
Chiefs of the Los Angeles Police Department
Los Angeles County, California sheriffs
People from Lebanon, Ohio
1904 deaths
California Republicans
Grand Army of the Republic officials